Konstantin Stanislavovich Nizovtsev (born 25 March 1979) is a former Russian professional football player.

Club career
He made his Russian Football National League debut for FC KAMAZ Naberezhnye Chelny on 31 March 2004 in a game against FC Neftekhimik Nizhnekamsk. He played 3 seasons in the FNL for KAMAZ, FC Vityaz Podolsk and FC Gazovik Orenburg.

External links
 

1979 births
Sportspeople from Perm, Russia
Living people
Russian footballers
Association football forwards
FC Amkar Perm players
FC KAMAZ Naberezhnye Chelny players
FC Vityaz Podolsk players
FC Orenburg players
FC Spartak Kostroma players
FC Volga Ulyanovsk players